The Blackhawk Museum, founded in 1988, consists of five distinct galleries in a facility in Danville, California with a significant collection of classic, rare, and unique automobiles. In addition to its gallery Classic Car Collection, the museum's four other galleries are The Spirit of the Old West, Art of Africa, Into China, and World of Nature.

The museum is located within the Blackhawk Plaza shopping center and is an affiliate through the Smithsonian Affiliations program. The museum is a subsidiary of a not-for-profit Behring Global Educational Foundation.

History
The museum was established to ensure that significant automotive treasures would be exhibited for public enjoyment and educational enrichment.

Hacienda-based architect Doug Dahlin is responsible for the design of the museum.

In February 2015, the Blackhawk Museum added a permanent collection of 19th century North American artifacts called The Spirit of the Old West, showcasing both the settler and Native American stories of the European expansion into North America during the 1800s.

Collections

The museum houses about ninety classic cars. It also houses a display showcasing the work of the Wheelchair Foundation.

One of the museum's most unusual possessions is a 1924 Hispano-Suiza H6C with a body paneled with tulipwood. Over the years, the museum has also housed a 1962 John F. Kennedy limousine and a Chinese Hongqi, the first Chinese-made automobile to be imported to the United States.

The museum is a partner in organizing the local Concours d'Elegance event, which showcases some of the museum's collection among the usual entrants.

Several changing exhibitions, representative of topics in transportation, culture, and science as they relate to our society, have been hosted in the various galleries and reception areas throughout the museum. Current exhibitions include selections of American jukeboxes from the golden age of the juke box and a display of antique gas pumps. Since 2000, the Blackhawk Automotive Museum has been an affiliate of the Smithsonian Institution, and together they have partnered to bring a variety of cultural exhibitions, historical artifacts, and significant automobiles from across the US.

Since its opening, exhibits showcasing African art, Chinese history, and exotic animals have been added.

References

External links

 Blackhawk Museum

Museums established in 1988
Automobile museums in California
Museums in Contra Costa County, California
Smithsonian Institution affiliates
1988 establishments in California